Manukapua "Manu" Maniapoto (29 June 1935 – 24 January 2017) was a New Zealand rugby union player. A lock, Maniapoto represented  at a provincial level, playing 107 times for the province between 1960 and 1968, scoring 10 tries and kicking one conversion. He was the first player to reach 100 games for Bay of Plenty. Of Ngāti Tūwharetoa, Ngāti Pikiao and Tuhourangi descent, Maniapoto was a member of the New Zealand Māori side from 1960 to 1966, and played for both Tai Rāwhiti (1963–1965) and Northern (1967) in the Prince of Wales Cup.

Born at Mokai, north of Taupo, on 29 June 1935, Maniapoto was the fourth son of Hema Maniapoto and Mamaeroa Maniapoto (née Hamiora), and the uncle of singer Moana Maniapoto. He died in Rotorua on 24 January 2017, and his tangihanga was held at Waitetoko Marae at Te Rangiita, on the shores of Lake Taupo.

References

1935 births
2017 deaths
Ngāti Tūwharetoa people
Ngāti Pikiao people
Tuhourangi people
Rugby union players from Waikato
New Zealand rugby union players
Bay of Plenty rugby union players
Māori All Blacks players
Rugby union locks